Lawrence William Quinn (born 25 December 1956) is a British Labour Party politician, railway engineer and from 1997 to 2005 he was the Member of Parliament for Scarborough and Whitby.

Early life and education
Quinn was born in Harraby, a suburb of Carlisle, then in Cumberland. He attended Pennine Way Primary School and North Cumbria Technology College (then known as Harraby Comprehensive School) Harraby Comprehensive School. In 1979, at Hatfield Polytechnic, he gained a BSc in civil engineering.

Prior to his election to Parliament, he was a civil engineer with British Rail (1979–94) and Railtrack London North-East (1994-7), and a member of North Yorkshire County Council from 1989 to 1993.

Parliamentary career
From 1989 to 1993, Quinn was a Councillor on North Yorkshire County Council, serving on the Highways Committee, the Policy and Resources Committee and the Planning Committee.

He was unexpectedly elected to Parliament in the 1997 General Election as Member of Parliament for Scarborough and Whitby, as part of the Labour landslide election victory while he was not really expecting to win a normally Conservative seat which he retained in the 2001 General Election. 

He sat for two terms until being ousted by Conservative candidate Robert Goodwill in the United Kingdom general election of 2005. Lawrie lost the seat by 1,245 votes. It has been suggested that votes for the local Liberal Democrat candidate, the Iraq war, and negative feeling towards Tony Blair (who visited Scarborough the day before polling day to consolidate support) resulted in the marginal loss.

Quinn is a member of the Fabian Society.

Since losing his seat he has returned to engineering, working as Tube Lines New Works Delivery Manager on secondment from Bechtel (2005 until 2007) then as the Rail Projects Delivery Manager for Bechtel based in London.

Personal life
He married Ann Christine Eames in 1982.

References

External links
 Official Website
 They Work For You
 

1956 births
Living people
Labour Party (UK) MPs for English constituencies
UK MPs 1997–2001
UK MPs 2001–2005
Politicians from Carlisle, Cumbria
Alumni of the University of Hertfordshire
Members of North Yorkshire County Council